Coryphopterus personatus, the masked goby, is a species of goby found in the Western Central Atlantic Ocean.  

References

Gobiidae
Fish of the Atlantic Ocean
Fish described in 1905
Taxa named by David Starr Jordan
Taxa named by Joseph Cheesman Thompson